Trip hop (sometimes used synonymously with "downtempo") is a musical genre that originated in the early 1990s in the United Kingdom, especially Bristol. It has been described as a psychedelic fusion of hip hop and electronica with slow tempos and an atmospheric sound, often incorporating elements of jazz, soul, funk, reggae, dub, R&B, and other forms of electronic music, as well as sampling from movie soundtracks and other eclectic sources.

The style emerged as a more experimental variant of breakbeat from the Bristol sound scene of the late 1980s and early 1990s, incorporating influences from jazz, soul, funk, dub, and rap music. It was pioneered by acts like Massive Attack, Tricky, and Portishead. The term was first coined in a 1994 Mixmag piece about American producer DJ Shadow. Trip hop achieved commercial success in the 1990s, and has been described as "Europe's alternative choice in the second half of the '90s".

Characteristics
Common musical aesthetics include a bass-heavy drumbeat, often providing the slowed down breakbeat samples similar to standard 1990s hip hop beats, giving the genre a more psychedelic and mainstream feel. Vocals in trip hop are often female and feature characteristics of various singing styles including R&B, jazz and rock. The female-dominant vocals of trip hop may be partially attributable to the influence of genres such as jazz and early R&B, in which female vocalists were more common. However, there are notable exceptions: Massive Attack and Groove Armada collaborated with male and female vocalists, Tricky often features vocally in his own productions along with Martina Topley-Bird, and Chris Corner provided vocals for later albums with Sneaker Pimps.

Trip hop is also known for its melancholic sound. This may be partly due to the fact that several acts were inspired by post-punk bands; Tricky and Massive Attack both covered and sampled songs of Siouxsie and the Banshees and The Cure. Tricky opened his second album Nearly God with a version of "Tattoo", a proto-trip-hop song of Siouxsie and the Banshees initially recorded in 1983.

Trip hop tracks often incorporate Rhodes pianos, saxophones, trumpets, flutes, and may employ unconventional instruments such as the theremin and Mellotron. Trip hop differs from hip hop in theme and overall tone. Contrasting with gangsta rap and its hard-hitting lyrics, trip hop offers a more aural atmospherics influenced by experimental folk and rock acts of the seventies, such as John Martyn, combined with instrumental hip hop, turntable scratching, and breakbeat rhythms. Regarded in some ways as a 1990s update of fusion, trip hop may be said to "transcend" the hardcore rap styles and lyrics with atmospheric overtones to create a more mellow tempo.

History

1990s
The term "trip-hop" first appeared in print in June 1994. Andy Pemberton, a music journalist writing for Mixmag, used it to describe "In/Flux", a single by American producer DJ Shadow and UK act RPM, with the latter signed to Mo' Wax Records.

In Bristol, hip hop began to seep into the consciousness of a subculture already well-schooled in Jamaican forms of music. DJs, MCs, b-boys and graffiti artists grouped together into informal soundsystems. Like the pioneering Bronx crews of DJs Kool Herc, Afrika Bambataa and Grandmaster Flash, the soundsystems provided party music for public spaces, often in the economically deprived council estates from which some of their members originated. Bristol's soundsystem DJs, drawing heavily on Jamaican dub music, typically used a laid-back, slow and heavy drum beat ("down tempo").

Bristol's Wild Bunch crew became one of the soundsystems to put a local spin on the international phenomenon, helping to birth Bristol's signature sound of trip hop, often termed "the Bristol Sound". The Wild Bunch and its associates included at various times in its existence the MC Adrian "Tricky Kid" Thaws, the graffiti artist and lyricist Robert "3D" Del Naja, producer Jonny Dollar and the DJs Nellee Hooper, Andrew "Mushroom" Vowles and Grant "Daddy G" Marshall. As the hip hop scene matured in Bristol and musical trends evolved further toward acid jazz and house in the late 1980s, the golden era of the soundsystem began to end. The Wild Bunch signed a record deal and evolved into Massive Attack, a core collective of 3D, Mushroom and Daddy G, with significant contributions from Tricky Kid (soon shortened to Tricky), Dollar, and Hooper on production duties, along with a rotating cast of other vocalists.

Another influence came from Gary Clail's Tackhead soundsystem. Clail often worked with former The Pop Group singer Mark Stewart. The latter experimented with his band Mark Stewart & the Maffia, which consisted of New York session musicians Skip McDonald, Doug Wimbish, and Keith LeBlanc, who had been a part of the house band for the Sugarhill Records record label. Produced by Adrian Sherwood, the music combined hip hop with experimental rock and dub and sounded like a premature version of what later became trip hop. In 1993, Kirsty MacColl released "Angel", one of the first examples of the genre crossing over to pop, a hybrid that dominated the charts toward the end of the 1990s.

Mainstream breakthrough

Massive Attack's first album Blue Lines was released in 1991 to huge success in the United Kingdom. Blue Lines was seen widely as the first major manifestation of a uniquely British hip hop movement, but the album's hit single "Unfinished Sympathy" and several other tracks, while their rhythms were largely sample-based, were not seen as hip hop songs in any conventional sense. Produced by Dollar, Shara Nelson (an R&B singer) featured on the orchestral "Unfinished", and Jamaican dance hall star Horace Andy provided vocals on several other tracks, as he would throughout Massive Attack's career. Massive Attack released their second album entitled Protection in 1994. Although Tricky stayed on in a lesser role and Hooper again produced, the fertile dance music scene of the early 1990s had informed the record and it was seen as an even more significant shift away from the Wild Bunch era.

In the June 1994 issue of UK magazine Mixmag, music journalist Andy Pemberton used the term trip hop to describe the hip hop instrumental "In/Flux", a 1993 single by San Francisco's DJ Shadow, and other similar tracks released on the Mo' Wax label and being played in London clubs at the time. "In/Flux", with its mixed up bpms, spoken word samples, strings, melodies, bizarre noises, prominent bass, and slow beats, gave the listener the impression they were on a musical trip, according to Pemberton. Soon, however, Massive Attack's dubby, jazzy, psychedelic, electronic textures, rooted in hip hop sampling technique but taking flight into many styles, were described by journalists as the template of the eponymous genre.

In 1993, Icelandic musician Björk released Debut, produced by Wild Bunch member Nellee Hooper. The album, although rooted in four-on-the-floor house music, contained elements of trip hop and is credited as one of the first albums to introduce electronic dance music into mainstream pop. She had been in contact with London's underground electronic music scene and was romantically involved with trip hop musician Tricky. Björk embraced trip hop even more with her 1995 album Post by collaborating with Tricky and Howie B. Homogenic, her 1997 album, has been described as a pinnacle of trip hop music.

1994 and 1995 saw trip hop near the peak of its popularity, with artists such as Howie B and Earthling making significant contributions. Ninja Tune, the independent record label founded by the Coldcut duo, would significantly influence the trip-hop sound in London and beyond with breakthrough artists DJ Food, 9 Lazy 9, Up, Bustle & Out, Funki Porcini and The Herbaliser, among others. The period also marked the debut of two acts who, along with Massive Attack, would define the Bristol scene for years to come.

In 1994, Portishead, a trio comprising singer Beth Gibbons, Geoff Barrow, and Adrian Utley, released their debut album Dummy. Their background differed from Massive Attack in many ways: one of Portishead's primary influences was 1960s and 1970s film soundtrack LPs. Nevertheless, Portishead shared the scratchy, jazz-sample-based aesthetic of early Massive Attack (whom Barrow had briefly worked with during the recording of Blue Lines), and the sullen, fragile vocals of Gibbons also brought them wide acclaim. In 1995, Dummy was awarded the Mercury Music Prize as the best British album of the year, giving trip-hop as a genre its greatest exposure yet. Portishead's music, seen as cutting edge in its film-noir feel and stylish, yet emotional appropriations of past sounds, was also widely imitated, causing the band to recoil from the trip-hop label they had inadvertently helped popularize, with Barrow stating "The whole trip-hop tag was nonsense. It was developed by people in London, and the people in Bristol just had to put up with it.".

Tricky also released his debut solo album Maxinquaye in 1995, to great critical acclaim. The album was produced largely in collaboration with Mark Saunders. Tricky employed whispered, often abstract stream-of-consciousness murmuring, remote from the gangsta-rap braggadocio of the mid-1990s US hip hop scene. Even more unusually, many of the solo songs on Maxinquaye featured little of Tricky's own voice: his then-lover, Martina Topley-Bird, sang them, including her reimagining of Public Enemy's militant 1988 rap "Black Steel in the Hour of Chaos", while other songs were male-female duets dealing with sex and love in oblique ways, over beds of sometimes dissonant samples. Within a year Tricky had released two more full-length albums which were considered even more challenging, without finding the same popularity as his Bristol contemporaries Massive Attack and Portishead. Through his brief collaborations with Björk, however, he also exerted influence closer to the pop and alternative rock mainstream, and he developed a large cult fan-base.

Although not as popular in the United States, bands like Portishead and Sneaker Pimps saw moderate airplay on alternative-rock stations across the country.

"After the Success of Trip Hop"

After the initial success of trip hop in the mid-1990s, the artists who made their own interpretations of the genre include Archive, Baby Fox, Bowery Electric, Esthero, Morcheeba, Sneaker Pimps, Anomie Belle, Alpha, Jaianto, Mudville and Cibo Matto and Lamb. These artists incorporated trip hop into other genres, including ambient, soul, IDM, industrial, dubstep, breakbeat, drum and bass, acid jazz, and new-age. The first printed use of the term "post-trip hop" was in an October 2002 article of The Independent, and was used to describe the band Second Person.

Trip hop has also influenced artists in other genres, including Gorillaz, Emancipator, Nine Inch Nails, Travis, PJ Harvey, How to Destroy Angels, Beth Orton, The Flaming Lips, Bitter:Sweet, Beck, The xx and Deftones. Several tracks on Australian pop singer Kylie Minogue's 1997 album Impossible Princess also displayed a trip hop influence.

Various prominent artists and groups, such as Janet Jackson, Kylie Minogue, Madonna, Björk, and Radiohead, have also been influenced by the genre. Trip hop has spawned several subgenres, including illbient (dub-based trip hop which combines ambient and industrial hip hop).

2000s
Trip hop continued to influence notable artists in the 2000s. Norwegian avant-garde band Ulver incorporated trip hop in their ambient/electronic/jazzy album Perdition City. Atmospheric rock band Antimatter included some trip hop elements in their first two albums. Australian composer Rob Dougan proposed a mix of trip hop beats, orchestral music and electronics. RJD2 began his career as a DJ, but in 2001, began releasing albums under El-P's Def Jux Label. Zero 7's album Simple Things, and in particular, its lead single "Destiny", was regarded highly by underground listeners and achieved significant popularity. In 2006, Gotye debuted his second studio album, Like Drawing Blood. The songs on the album featured down-tempo hip-hop beats and dub style bass reminiscent of trip hop. Hip hop groups Zion I and the Dub Pistols also displayed heavy trip hop influence. Norwegian singer and songwriter Kate Havnevik is a classically trained musician, but also incorporates trip hop into her work.

Many producers who were not explicitly trip-hop artists also displayed its influence during the early 2000s. Daniel Nakamura, aka Dan the Automator, released two albums that were heavily inspired by trip hop. 2000 album Deltron 3030, was a concept album about a rapper from the future, portrayed by Del the Funky Homosapien. 2001 saw the release of his side project, Lovage and the album Music to Make Love to Your Old Lady By, with special guests Mike Patton, Prince Paul, Maseo, Damon Albarn, and Afrika Bambaataa. British producer Fatboy Slim's breakthrough album, Halfway Between the Gutter and the Stars, was his most commercially successful release. Another heavily trip-hop influenced band, Elsiane, published their first album Hybrid in 2007, creating a "mellow, hypnotic atmosphere utilized in the ’90s by big names like Massive Attack, Portishead, etc.".

2010s
Major notable releases include Massive Attack's Heligoland, their first studio album in seven years, and Dutch's A Bright Cold Day in 2010, which was met with positive reviews including a 7/10 score from inyourspeakers.com. The latter group consists of members including Jedi Mind Tricks producer Stoupe the Enemy of Mankind.

DJ Shadow's The Less You Know, the Better was released in 2011 after a highly publicised unveiling of songs, including appearances on Zane Lowe's BBC Radio 1 show and previews at a performance in Antwerp in August 2010. The album was met with "generally favorable reviews" on Metacritic, with some criticising Shadow's lack of originality. Sam Richards of NME felt that the album sounded "like the work of a man struggling to recall his motivations for making music in the first place."

Beak's album titled ">>" was released in 2012 and received high scores from journalists, including an 8/10 from NME and Spin magazine.

Lana Del Rey released her second album, Born to Die in 2012, which contained a string of trip hop ballads. The album topped the charts in eleven countries, including Australia, France, Germany, and the United Kingdom; it has sold 3.4 million copies worldwide as of 2013 according to International Federation of the Phonographic Industry. 

Edinburgh based Singer-Songwriter David Knowles emerged in 2015 and cited Trip-Hop as a major influence on his sound, with David and similar artists such as Fink and Junip showcasing a chilled acoustic style of trip-hop

See also
 Chill-out music
 Acid house
 List of electronic music genres
 List of trip hop artists

References

External links

[ "Trip-Hop" Allmusic guide essay by Sean Cooper]
"World of Trip Hop" Webpage
Triptica - An internet Radio dedicated to Trip Hop
NPR's history of trip hop

 
1994 introductions
Electronica
Hip hop genres
Electronic music genres
Hip hop
British hip hop genres
Fusion music genres
English styles of music
Music in Bristol
Downtempo